Lake Metigoshe State Park is a public recreation area occupying some  on the shores of Lake Metigoshe in the Turtle Mountains, 14 miles northeast of Bottineau, North Dakota, on the Canada–US border. The state park lies adjacent to the southwest corner of the much larger Turtle Mountain Provincial Park in Manitoba. A small portion of the lake extends northward into the Rural Municipality of Winchester but is not part of either park.

History
The name Lake Metigoshe is derived from the Ojibwe phrase mitigoshi-waashegami-zaaga'igan meaning "clearwater lake of scrub-oaks." The area was also once home to the Blackfoot, Hidatsa, and Assiniboine peoples.

The park was developed by workers with the WPA who arrived at the site beginning in 1934.  Their improvements included construction of a lodge, recreation rooms large enough for 200 people, roads, and various out buildings. A stone inscribed "WPA 1938" found near the park entrance commemorates their work. The park was formally established on February 17, 1937.

Activities and amenities
The park offers swimming, canoeing, sailing, water-skiing and other water sports, modern and primitive camping areas, and picnicking. Lake Metigoshe has northern pike, walleye, and perch for fishing. Winter activities include snowmobiling, cross-country skiing, skating, sledding, and ice fishing. The Turtle Mountain Outdoor Learning Center offers ecology, conservation, and outdoor recreation programs.

Events
The Club de Skinautique water-skiers practice and perform on Lake Metigoshe. Known as the "Skinautiques," the club has performed water skiing shows every summer since 1958.

References

External links
Lake Metigoshe State Park North Dakota Parks and Recreation Department
Lake Metigoshe State Park Map North Dakota Parks and Recreation Department

State parks of North Dakota
Protected areas established in 1937
1937 establishments in North Dakota
Protected areas of Bottineau County, North Dakota
Works Progress Administration in North Dakota
Nature centers in North Dakota
Metigoshe
Metigoshe